Frédérique Constant SA is a Swiss manufacture of luxury wristwatches based in Plan-les-Ouates, Geneva. It was acquired in 2016 by Citizen Holdings of Tokyo, Japan.  The company was established in 1988 by Peter Stas and Aletta Stas-Bax (a Dutch married couple).

Before the sale to Citizen, Frédérique Constant SA was owned by Union Horlogère Holding B.V., which also owned Alpina Watches International SA, and Ateliers deMonaco SA, and was, in turn, owned by Frédérique Constant Holding SA.

History
The company was founded in 1988 by Aletta Francoise Frédérique Stas-Bax and Peter Constant Stas (a Dutch married couple). Its name is derived from the names of great-grandparents of each founder – specifically Frédérique Schreiner (1881–1969) and Constant Stas (1880–1967), the latter of whom founded a company producing watch dials in 1904.

In 2002, to diversify the Frédérique Constant group, Aletta and her husband acquired Alpina Watches, a manufacturer of Swiss sports watches founded in 1883.

Frederique Constant has grown into one of the larger Swiss watch manufacturers. In 2011, production reached over 120,000 watches, sold in over 2,700 points of sale in more than 100 countries. Frederique Constant positions itself in the accessible luxury segment, with most of its watches selling in the price range of CHF 1,000–5,000 retail. In 2011, the company said that it expected to continue growing at an annual rate of 25%, doubling in size every three years.

In 2013, Aletta and Peter Stas (with two other contributors) wrote a book Live your passion – Building a watch manufacture, about their passion for watchmaking and the history of Frederique Constant.

In May 2016, Citizen Holdings (which also owns Bulova) announced its intention to acquire Frederique Constant Holding SA, which included Union Horlogère Holding B.V., which in turn included Frederique Constant SA, Alpina Watches International SA, and Ateliers deMonaco SA. The same year, the Frederique Constant Group acquires its main distributors, including its largest market, Macher SA in Switzerland, founded in 2002 by Alexis Gouten.

Manufacture facilities
Frederique Constant operates a manufacture in Geneva in a 3200 square metres, divided over four floors, with sectors for movement component production, movement assembly, watch assembly, and quality control. Numerically controlled machinery is located in a large workshop in the basement, where all component manufacturing is concentrated. Movement and watch assembly, as well as quality control, are primarily organized on the first floor.

Frederique Constant extends Geneva manufacturing facility with an additional 3000 m2 space, bringing the Frederique Constant Group’s headquarters up to 6200 m2.

Ownership structure and sister brands

Prior to the sale to Citizen, Frederique Constant Holding SA owned Union Horlogère Holding B.V., which also owned Alpina Watches International SA, a watch manufacture founded in 1883 by Gottlieb Hauser, a watchmaker in Winterthur who founded the Swiss Watchmakers Corporation ("Union Horlogère Suisse").

Additionally, Union Horlogère Holding B.V. also owned Ateliers deMonaco SA, a watch manufacture founded in 2008 (the same year as Frédérique Constant SA) by Peter Stas with two other partners.

All three companies (Frédérique Constant SA, Alpina Watches International SA, and Ateliers deMonaco SA) are based in Plan-les-Ouates, Geneva, Switzerland.

These companies have together been referred to as the Frederique Constant Group.

Products and product features

Heart Beat movement
In 2001, Frederique Constant began the development of its first watch movement in cooperation with the École d'Horlogerie de Genève, École d'Ingenieurs de Genève and the Horloge Vakschool Zadkine. The Heart Beat Manufacture has a characteristic bridge for the balance wheel on the front side of the movement. Having the bridge for the balance wheel on the front side made it possible to have the spiral and fine regulation on the front side as well, creating the company's "Heart Beat" design. The company patented this construction as an innovation in watch design technology.

The company's "Heart Beat Manufacture" won the "Watch of the Year" Award of Horloges Magazine in the category up to €3000 in 2005.

As of 2014, the company has brought 15 distinct movements to the market, starting with the introduction of its original Heart Beat in 2004.

Silicon escapement wheel

In February 2007, Frederique Constant began production of the Silicon escapement wheel (first introduced to the industry by Patek Philippe in 2005). The company introduced the Heart Beat Calibre FC 935 Silicium in October 2007. It implements new high-tech materials to create better, more precise and more reliable mechanical watches. Deep reactive-ion etching is used to shape silicon wafers into escapement wheels, pallets, and plateaus. Silicon is lighter, harder and stronger than metal. Etched into tiny skeletal structures that would be impossible to form with metal, it becomes the featherweight heart of a mechanism that can run at a far higher accuracy. The silicon parts are virtually frictionless, so need no lubrication, and are immune to most external forces. And when bonded with a carbon coating, silicon's only real drawback, brittleness, can also be overcome.

Tourbillon 

In April 2008, Frederique Constant created a tourbillon with a silicon escape-wheel and, for the first time, an amplitude of over 300 degrees between its vertical and horizontal positions. Coupled with rapid oscillation, this gives the watch an unusually high level of precision.

Manufacture
Frederique Constant offers 15 manufacture (in-house) movements in addition to their mainstream line of ETA-powered watches. The high-end handwinding FC-910 caliber, introduced in 2004, was joined by Tourbillon in 2008 and a mainstream FC-7xx caliber range in 2009. The addition of the second-generation manufacture movements makes the company unusual in offering a complete in-house watch for under €2,000 MSRP. Watches with in-house movements are identified with the word, "Manufacture" in their model name, or can be identified by looking for the tourbillon, FC-9xx, or FC-7xx movement in their specifications.

Worldtimer 
Frederique Constant introduced a Worldtimer watch in 2012 with a unique mechanism, adjusted solely via the crown. The Worldtimer function is used by selecting the desired city and placing it at the 12 o'clock position on the dial. Internal discs automatically synchronise, and after that, it is possible to see what time it is in any of the 24 cities on the dial. In addition, thin discs also indicate at a glance whether it is day (white disc) or night (black disc).

Runabout product line
The Runabout range is a main collection of Frederique Constant and is designed to pay tribute to the runabout gentlemen's sports boats of the Roaring Twenties. The company has sponsored the Hélice Classique Genève and Lake Tahoe Concours d'Elegance boating events, which have showcased vintage wood boats.

Vintage rally line and sponsorships
Since 2004, Frederique Constant has sponsored several classic car rallies worldwide, and it develops limited-edition watches for each of these sponsorships. The sponsorships have included Healey Challenges, Peking to Paris, and the Carrera Panamericana.

Horological Smartwatch
In 2015, the Frederique Constant and Alpina brands introduced the "Horological Smartwatch", a smartwatch product with motion and sleep tracking functions that uses a secondary analog dial rather than a screen for its display – giving the timepiece a more classic look than other such devices. The lack of a display screen also provides significant power saving – enabling a battery life of two years or more, in contrast to other smartwatches that must be charged daily. This product line uses "MotionX" core technology, licensed from the California-based company Fullpower Technologies and was developed in a joint venture known as Manufacture Modules Technologies (MMT).

Hybrid Manufacture Smartwatch
In 2018, Frederique Constant revealed the world's first mechanical smartwatch, the Hybrid Manufacture that fuses smartwatch technology with a mechanical movement.

See also 
 List of watch manufacturers

References

External links 
 Frédérique Constant Official Site

Luxury brands
Watch manufacturing companies of Switzerland
Companies based in the canton of Geneva
Swiss watch brands
Companies established in 1988
Citizen Watch